

Geophysics